Opus Dei and politics is a discussion on Opus Dei's view on politics, its role in politics and its members involvement in politics.

General political matters

Researchers, historians and writers on Opus Dei have said that Opus Dei has a novel approach to political matters whereby Christians are free and personally responsible in temporal affairs. They have seen that Opus Dei members follow Escrivá's teachings: "There are no dogmas in temporal matters." "Respect for its members' freedom is an essential condition for Opus Dei's very existence," says Escrivá. "If Opus Dei had been involved in politics, even for an instant," he once wrote, "in that moment of error I would have left Opus Dei." (Le Tourneau 1989, p. 49)

V. Messori says that Escrivá set up inviolable and perpetual rules to establish the essential conditions for Opus Dei's life. Among them is this clause from the Statutes: "Each faithful of the Prelature enjoys the same liberties as other Catholic citizens in what concerns professional activity, social, political doctrines, etc. The authorities of the Prelature, however, must abstain from giving any counsel in matters of this nature. Therefore, this full liberty can be diminished only by the norms that apply to all Catholics and are established by the bishop or Bishop's Conference." (88.3)

After investigating into the actual implementation of these rules and spirit, Messori concludes that (1) the members of Opus Dei receive nothing else but spiritual advice, (2) they do not operate as a herd in political affairs, but (3) consider respect for pluralism in matters not concerning the faith one way of obeying a central conviction of the founder. (See Messori 1997, p. 175)

Moreover, aside from those working on the right side of the political spectrum, . It is impossible, according to supporters, for all of them to be herded into one political agenda.

 

However, supporters of Opus Dei point out that  They  These circumstances could make Opus Dei appear, on the one hand, closer to the Right Wing movements of the era; on the other, these could have overemphasized information that do not show an explicit or an implicit support of any of these dictatorships. Thus, some writers state that it is arguable that

Hitler and Nazism

The Unofficial Opus Dei Webpage says:  An article in the Telegraph also reports that Felzmann heard Escrivá, "Vlad, Hitler couldn't have been such a bad person," the Father apparently said. "He couldn't have killed six million. It couldn't have been more than four million." Opus Dei supporters state that Fr. Felzmann, on saying these things, is being inconsistent with a testimony he wrote in 1980 saying that Escrivá is "a saint for today." (Documentation Service Vol V, 3, March 1992) They claim that former members, called "apostates" by their former organization, often lend their voices to coalitions fighting their previous religious organizations (see Dr. Bryan R. Wilson).

Escrivá responded to these accusations in 1975, professing his "love for the Jewish people" . In addition, according to Opus Dei supporters, the one oral testimony regarding the supposed sympathies of Escrivá towards Hitler is disputed by various documented testimonies of non-members and members who  He also allegedly condemned Nazism for being a "heresy," "anti-Christian," "pagan," "totalitarian," "a political aberration," and "racist." About the Nazi persecution against the Christians and the Jews, he was reported to say: "one victim is enough to condemn it". (Urbano 1995, p. 118-199) He condemned it, even going against Spain's public and official attitude of keeping silent about Nazism, despite the Holy See's condemnation of Hitler's ideology. Thus, del Portillo, the Opus Dei prelate who succeeded Escrivá, said that the attacks against the founder of Opus Dei are "a patent falsehood," part of "a slanderous campaign." (del Portillo 1996, p. 22-25). Though members of the Jewish community have defended Escrivá in the past, the issue was far from resolved at the time of his beatification in 1992.

Francoist Spain

There are  written by investigative journalists, particularly those written outside Spain like the United States, Britain, Germany and Italy, which agree that Opus Dei was and continues to be "apolitical", meaning that Opus Dei has no purposeful strategy as a whole or secret agenda as some have suspected. John Allen (2005), an American journalist, drawing from the latest historical research, said that "some members worked in Franco's Spain, became ministers of his. But Opus Dei people are free to do whatever they wish politically. Other members were against Franco." Allen cites the dissident Rafael Calvo Serer, who was driven into exile in the early 70s and saw the newspaper he published closed by the government. Allen confirms that by the latter stages of the Franco era, Opus Dei members in Spain were divided "50/50" over the regime.

Allen also recounts the story of Giovanni Benelli and Josemaría Escrivá. Cardinal Benelli - right-hand man of Paul VI- wanted a Catholic Party in Spain similar to Italy's Democrazia Cristiana and wanted all Spanish Roman Catholics to adhere to this policy. Escrivá, who was truly desperate in asking the help of Benelli to talk to Paul VI about the foremost concern in his mind, the juridical problem of Opus Dei which can be resolved by becoming a "personal prelature" status for Opus Dei, refused Benelli. And he later complained to Benelli for holding Opus Dei hostage so Benelli could have his way. Allen says: "The Benelli story offers a good case for testing whether Escriva was serious about Opus Dei having no political agenda. If ever there was a set of circumstances propitious for a "power grab", this situation presented them. ...If Opus Dei led the way in the creation of Spanish version of Christian Democracy, its imaginable that its total of 8 ministers in 36 years under Franco would have been swamped by its representation in a new Spanish government."

Escriva and Franco
Critics, however, point to a letter written on 23 May 1958 by Escrivá to General Francisco Franco, dictator of Spain. They also say that Escrivá supported Franco. On the other hand, members of Opus Dei say that the letter of Escrivá (written 8 years after the US, the UN and Allies recognized Franco) shows his exemplary virtues as a citizen and a Catholic priest, as he says: "Although a stranger to any political activity, I cannot help but rejoice as a priest and Spaniard" that Spain's Head of State should proclaim that Spain accepts the law of God according to the doctrine of the Roman Catholic Church, a faith which will inspire its legislation. Escrivá tells him that "It is in fidelity to our people's Catholic tradition that the best guarantee of success in acts of government, the certainty of a just and lasting peace within the national community.... will always be found." According to supporters, by saying this Escrivá was encouraging Franco (together with hundreds of Spaniards who wrote to Franco) to respect human rights, human dignity and freedom. They say that Escrivá acknowledged Franco's role in bringing order to the country but he totally rejected any form of clericalism whereby Catholics have a single-party mentality or use public power as a secular arm of the Church. Supporters also refer to an immediate correction given by Escrivá to Franco when one of the numeraries was insulted by the regime as "a person without a family." (del Portillo, 1996, p. 25-28) However, historians agree that the Catholic Church, of which Escrivá was a member, was a bulwark of the Franco regime, notwithstanding the dictatorship's brutal repression against Republicans and Communists following the Spanish Civil War.

John Allen in Opus Dei: Secrets and Power in the Catholic Church (2005) states that  from the very beginning to the end of the Franco regime Escrivá maintained a complete silence about Franco's government. He claims that there is not one public statement on the records from Escriva — either critical of the regime or in favor. In the 1930s and 1940s, this silence was even interpreted as passive opposition.  By the 1960s and 1970s, when the overwhelming sentiment in Spanish Roman Catholicism had become critical of Franco, his silence was interpreted as a kind of covert support. This silence, according to Allen, meant there was no corporate position of Opus Dei towards Franco.

“[I]t’s worth noting that in the context of the Spanish Civil War, in which anticlerical Republican forces killed 13 bishops, 4,000 diocesan priests, 2,000 male religious, and 300 nuns, virtually every group and layer of life in the Catholic Church in Spain was ‘pro-Franco.’” Allen goes on to note that despite this fact, “there is no instance in which [Escrivá] either praised or criticized the regime” throughout its long reign. “In the 1930s and 1940s, when the overwhelming sentiment in Catholic Spain was pro-Franco, Escrivá’s silence was therefore often read to betoken a hidden liberalism; by the 1960s and 1970s, when Catholic opinion had shifted, that same silence was interpreted as masking a pro-Franco conservatism,” he writes. “The overall impression one gets is that Escrivá strove to maintain neutrality with respect to the Franco regime, even if privately he felt some sympathy for a leader trying by his lights to be an upright Christian,” Mr. Allen concludes. “A charge of ‘pro-Franco’ cannot be sustained, except in the generic sense that most Spanish Catholics were initially supportive of Franco.... The most one can say is that Escrivá was not ‘anti-Franco’ either.”

Opus Dei members in Franco's government
Critics underline that several  They say that this is evidence of the organization's penetration into the highest echelons of Spain's Fascist regime. It is worth noting that 

To claim that ministers who served under Franco are proof of the link between fascism and Opus Dei, is, according to Prof. Berglar, a gross calumny. First, because as hardworking professionals striving after excellence, many Opus Dei members had the personal qualifications to be appointed in government as technocrats assisting in the NATO-USA supported economic Spanish miracle. "In 1957 Franco restructured his cabinet with a view to restoring the economy of Spain and guiding the nation toward a modern fiscal system. With such purposes in mind, he appointed a number of talented young bankers and economists," Berglar states. The technocrats who were members of Opus Dei, belonged to different persuasions. They were largely responsible for devising, introducing, and later administering the economic stabilization program that formed the basis of Spain's economic development. These technocrats encouraged competition as a means of achieving rapid economic growth, and they favored economic integration with Europe. Although these policies implied eventual political as well as economic liberalization, this was not Opus Dei's avowed goal, for the group officially does not have any political goal.

Historian Paul Preston, a specialist on the Spanish Civil War and Franco,  states the following: "The arrival of the technocrats has been interpreted variously as a planned take-over by Opus Dei and a clever move by Franco to 'fill vacant seats in the latest round of musical chairs'. In fact, the arrival of the technocrats was neither sinister nor cunning but rather a piecemeal and pragmatic response to a specific set of problems. By the beginning of 1957, the regime faced political and economic bankruptcy. Franco and Carrero Blanco were looking for new blood and fresh ideas. To be acceptable, new men had to come from within the Movimiento, be Catholic, accepted the idea of an eventual return to the monarchy and be, in Francoist terms, apolitical. López Rodó, Navarro Rubio and Ullastres  were ideal. López Rodó was the nominee of Carrero Blanco. The dynamic Navarro Rubio was the Caudillo's choice. Franco had known him since 1949. He was a Procurador en Cortes for the Sindicatos and had been highly recommended by the outgoing Minister of Agriculture, Rafael Cavestany. Both López Rodó and Navarro Rubio suggested Ullastres...Bright, hard-working functionaries were emerging who were more concerned to get top jobs in the state apparatus than to implement the ideology of Falangism. That was entirely true of men like López Rodó and Navarro Rubio who were labelled as being primarily of Opus Dei but were more accurately seen as being part of what came to be called the 'bureaucracy of number ones', those who had won competitive civil service examinations or university chairs while still very young." (Italics added)

Brian Crozier also states: "The charge that Opus Dei had been aiming at political power, and had achieved it at last, was heard in February 1957, when Ullastres and Navarro Rubio joined Franco’s cabinet. In this bare form, the charge seems to be unfounded because based on a misconception of what Opus Dei is. It is not, as its enemies either think or want others to think, a political party; nor is it a political pressure group. Nor, for that matter, is it a kind of super labour-exchange for politicians... What happened was more pragmatic and less sinister. Franco had heard of the intellectual and technical merits of Ullastres and Navarro Rubio and sent for them; they happened to be members of Opus Dei. On the same occasion, he had heard of the intellectual and technical merits of Castiella and Gual Villalbi and sent for them; but Castiella and Gual Villalbi happened not to be members of Opus Dei. In other words, Opus Dei was not a group to be conciliated by being given a share in power, as the Monarchists were, or the Falange, or the Army." (Italics added)

Messori, who is not a member of Opus Dei, also states that there were only 8 members of Opus Dei (5 of whom served for only one term or but a few months) of the 116 ministers under Franco's regime, and they started serving only after 1956, a few years after the Allies recognized it. There was no Opus Dei member in his last cabinet. They were never a majority: "The myth of an Opus Dei dominated Franco government is just that--a myth" (Messori 1997, p. 30) (Berglar 1994, p. 186).  

A number of historians say that there were members who were sentenced to prison or left Spain under Franco because they did not agree with the politics of Franco and his regime. (See Opus Dei: Prominent Members) Antonio Fontán and Rafael Calvo Serer are examples of journalists who fought for democracy and press freedom and were persecuted by Franco's Regime. Antonio Fontan would later become the Senate President. Falangists, the main political organization supporting Franco, suspected Escrivá of "internationalism, anti-Spanish sentiment, and freemasonry," according to Berglar, who states that "during "the first decade of Franco's regime, Opus Dei and Escrivá were attacked with perseverance bordering on fanaticism, not by enemies but by supporters of the new Spanish state". Escrivá was even reported to the 'Tribunal for the Fight against Freemasonry.'" (Berglar 1994, p.180-181; see also Vasquez de Prada 1997).

Investigative journalist John L. Allen Jr., who is not a member of Opus Dei, supports Berglar's statements. John Allen also says that there were Opus Dei priests who were involved in opposition movements.  He also states that the only Spanish bishop who was put in jail during the Franco era is one of the two Opus Dei cardinals, Cardinal Julián Herranz, who was a young Opus Dei layman at that time fighting for agrarian revolution in Andalusia, Spain.

Allen also states that Opus Dei members (sociologically speaking and not institutionally speaking) acted towards Franco as all Spanish Catholics would. Sociologically at the beginning of Franco's regime, they hailed him as a savior who liberated them from the communism and anarchism of the Second Spanish Republic;this attitude evolved through time and in the end,

Controversy about Opus Dei's political influence 
Journalists John L. Allen Jr. and Vittorio Messori claim that Opus Dei as an institution was neither pro-Franco nor anti-Franco. It was "savagely attacked" says Allen by its enemies, starting with certain Jesuits immediately after the civil war. These Jesuits did not understand the novelty of its theological doctrine on the universal call to holiness, says Allen. And, according to Messori, its reputation was besmirched deliberately by some groups of the Falange for they wrongly viewed it as a political rival, since these Spaniards tended to have a Catholic one-party mentality in politics, and did not understand Escriva's new doctrine on the freedom and responsibility of each Catholic in temporal matters. They failed to see, says Messori, that there were many other members of Opus Dei who were against the Franco Regime, like Rafael Calvo Serrer and Antonio Fontán. This deliberate campaign of the Falange led to the Black Legend that Opus Dei is a type of political party, he says. Brian Crozier, an English historian, says that "Opus Dei is neither a political party nor a political pressure group as its enemies want people to believe." Messori says that Opus Dei's fidelity to the Catholic faith makes it capable of new ideas and its members contributors for the advancement of society.

Pope John Paul II, who viewed the orthodox Catholicism of the organization with favor, established it as personal prelature, a part of the socio-administrative organization of the Catholic Church. Escriva claimed in interviews in the 1960s that the influence of Opus Dei was not socio-economic but ethical. He declared that Opus Dei goal is for rich and poor to work together in building a more just, more human and more progressive society. Josemaría Escrivá de Balaguer was canonized by John Paul II in 2002, a choice which has been criticized by progressive sectors of the Church.

See also 

Opus Dei

Footnotes

References

 Arango, E. Ramón. 1995 (1985). Spain. Democracy Regained (Second Edition). Boulder, CO: Westview. 
 Carr, Raymond, and Fusi, Juan Pablo. 1991 (1979). Spain: Dictatorship to democracy. London: Routledge. 
 De Blaye, Edouard. 1976 (1974). Franco and the Politics of Spain. Middlessex: Penguin. [original title Franco ou la monarchie sans roi, Editions Stock] 
Descola, Jean. O Espagne, Albin Michel, Paris, 1976.
 Ellwood, Sheelagh. 1994. Franco. Harlow, UK: Longman. 
 Graham, Robert. 1984. Spain. Change of a Nation. London: Michael Joseph. 
 Gunther, Richard. 1980. Public Policy in a No-Party State. Spanish Planning and Budgeting in the Twilight of the Franquist Era. Berkeley, CA: University of California.
 Gunther. Richard. 1980. Public Policy in a No-Party State. Spanish Planning and Budgeting in the Twilight of the Franquist Era. Berkeley: University of California. 
 Herr, Richard. 1971. Spain. Englewood Cliffs, NJ: Prentice-Hall. 
 Hills, George. 1970. Spain. London: Ernest Benn Ltd.
Paredes, Javier (coord.), Historia contemporánea de España (siglo XX), Ariel Historia, Barcelona 1998.
 Payne, Stanley G. 1999. Fascism in Spain. 1923-1977. Madison, WI: Wisconsin University. 
 Preston, Paul. 1990. The Politics of Revenge. Fascism and the Military in Twentieth-Century Spain. London. Unwin Hyman. 
 Preston, Paul. 1993. Franco. A Biography. London: HarperCollins.
 Salgado Araujo, Francisco Franco, Mis conversaciones privadas con Franco, Col. Espejo de España, Ed. Planeta, 1976.
Tusell, Javier. Manual Historia de España: Siglo XX, Historia 16, Madrid, 1990.
Jewish Telegraphic Agency, "Conservative Catholic Group Denies Candidate for Sainthood Hated Jews", January 1992
Various Authors, (Manuel Ferrer, José de Armas, José Lino Feo, Manuel Fernández Areal, Charles Powell, Alfonso Ascanio), Franquismo y transición democrática: Lecciones recientes de Historia reciente de España, Centro de Estudios de Humanidades, Las Palmas de Gran Canaria, 1993.

External links
, JTA article preceding beatification
Peter Duffy, "The Work," Among Us, America Magazine, November 21, 2005
The Evolution of Opus Dei by Alberto Moncada, former member.
St Josemaría Escrivá and Nazism
Freedom, politics and Opus Dei - about Franco
What is Opus Dei? BBC World

Opus Dei